Muscular atrophy-ataxia-retinitis pigmentosa-diabetes mellitus syndrome, also known as Kurukawa-Takagi-Nakao syndrome is a very rare genetic disorder which is characterized by muscular atrophy, cerebellar ataxia, reduced sense of touch, retinal degeneration, and diabetes mellitus beginning in late childhood-early adolescence. It is inherited in an autosomal dominant manner. It has been described in 10 members from a large 4-generation Japanese family (1986).

References 

Genetic diseases and disorders
Autosomal dominant disorders